Hong Kong Metropolitan University (HKMU) is a university in Ho Man Tin, Hong Kong. Established as the Open Learning Institute of Hong Kong by the Hong Kong government in 1989, HKMU now consists of five schools, namely the School of Arts and Social Sciences, Lee Shau Kee School of Business and Administration, School of Education and Languages, School of Nursing and Health Studies, and the School of Science and Technology.

HKMU is the only self-financing university set up by the government. It began as a distance-learning-based university, but is now in effect two universities in one. It has started to offer full-time programmes since 2001 and has participated in Hong Kong's centralised joint university admission system (JUPAS) since 2007. Currently, it has a headcount of more than 9,600 students on its full-time face-to-face programmes, occupying one-sixth of all undergraduate students in Hong Kong. The current president is Professor Lam Kwan Sing.

It adopted its current name on 1 September 2021.

History 
Hong Kong Metropolitan University, formerly as the Open Learning Institute of Hong Kong (OLI) and the Open University of Hong Kong (OUHK), was established by the Hong Kong Government in 1989. With the consent made by the Governor of Hong Kong and the Executive Council of Hong Kong in May 1997, the motion for the third reading was agreed by the Legislative Council of Hong Kong. The OLI officially upgraded to the Open University of Hong Kong. The promotion marks the public recognition to the achievements and contributions made by the OUHK in the academic field.

Early Development 
In May 1989, the Hong Kong Government established the Open Learning Institute of Hong Kong. The OLI was the first distance-learning-based higher education institution in Hong Kong. The OLI adopted a flexible academic score system, allowing its students to accumulate their credits by stage until successfully earning the degree. In August 1992, the Hong Kong Government announced to accept graduates from the OLI to apply for its positions which required a university degree. In November 1992, the OLI offered 17-degree programmes which were approved by the Hong Kong Council for Accreditation of Academic Qualifications. In November 1993, the OLI held its first congregation.

Upgrade to a University 
In June 1995, the OLI passed the accreditation by the Hong Kong Council for Accreditation of Academic Qualifications and received the recommendation of granting the self-accrediting status after June 1996. In October 1996, the Hong Kong Government granted the OLI with the self-accrediting status. It recognised the capacity of self-management and quality assurance of the Institution. In February 1997, the Hong Kong Executive Council approved in principle to the upgrade the OLI to a university. In May 1997, the motion for the third reading was agreed by the Legislative Council of Hong Kong. The OLI was upgraded to the Open University of Hong Kong and became the seventh statutory university in Hong Kong.

Continuous Improvement 
In October 1998, students of the OUHK were allowed to be included in the Non-means-tested Loan Scheme for Full-time Tertiary Students (NLSFT). In June 1999, the OUHK was conferred the Prize of Excellence for Institutions by the International Council for Open and Distance Education (ICDE) for 1999. In October 1999, the Hong Kong Government approved a one-off grant of HK$50 million to develop the University into a Centre of Excellence in Distance and Adult Learning and accepted the OUHK to apply for the grant of the Research Grants Council (RGC). In June 2000, the electronic library of the OUHK won the Stockholm Challenge Award in a global IT contest.

In October 2000, the Open University of Hong Kong Centre for Continuing and Community Education was officially renamed as the Li Ka Shing Institute of Professional and Continuing Education to acknowledge the donation of HK$40 million by the Li Ka Shing Foundation in supporting the establishment of the Island Learning Centre.

Launch of Full-time Programmes 
In September 2001, the OUHK firstly launched the full-time associate degree programme. In March 2005, the University introduced the first full-time top-up degree programme. In May 2004, the OUHK partnered with the Vocational Training Council (VTC) to introduce top-up degree programmes.

In May 2005, the OUHK started to collaborate with local hospitals for nurse degree education. The University partnered with Cathay Pacific Airways to organise the Professional Diploma in Inflight Service programme. In October 2005, the University partnered with the Hong Kong Police Force for recruit police constables' foundation training.

In September 2006, the OUHK officially started to participate in the Hong Kong's centralised joint university admission system (JUPAS), becoming the first higher education institution offering self-financing degree programmes. In the meantime, the OUHK partner with the Hong Kong Baptist Hospital. In June 2007, the OUHK established Centre for Putonghua Education and Testing. In August 2007, the OUHK signed the Memorandum of Understanding with the Union Hospital, partnering to launch full-time Bachelor of Nursing with honours (General Health) programmes. In the meantime, the OUHK freely opened its teaching materials, providing Hong Kong residents with self-studying opportunities. In September 2007, the University Council unanimously approved to name the School of Business and Administration after Dr Lee Shau-kee to acknowledge his donation of HK$50 million in supporting the establishment of the University Development Fund. In December 2007, the OUHK was included in the Government's Matching Grant Scheme for the first time and raised a total of HK$160 million as a result.

In May 2008, the OUHK firstly partnered with the Clothing Industry Training Authority (CITA) on fashion business top-up degree

In June 2008, full-time nursing programmes were accredited by the Nursing Council.

Research Centre 

Under the co-ordination of the Research Grants Council (RGC) in 2014, the OUHK was granted a subsidy of HK$18 million in the application of research grants for local self-financing institutions to set up the Institute for Research in Innovative Technology & Sustainability, the Research Institute for Digital Culture and Humanities and the Centre of Chinese Culture.

Programmes offered

Full-time programmes 
Full-time programmes have been the recent main focus of the HKMU. Similar to the full-time programmes of other universities, the programmes are conducted by lectures and tutorials. Some even include laboratory courses and practicums. Face-to-face programmes mainly consists of full-time and part-time modes. Some full-time face-to-face programmes have been included in the Hong Kong's centralised joint university admission system (JUPAS).

Part-time programmes 
Part-time programmes include distance learning programmes, the programmes have been the ongoing programmes of the HKMU since its establishment. The University provides students applied for distance learning programmes with self-study materials. Some programmes even include interactive CD-ROMs, videos and computer software. The University's tutors conduct regular tutorials on weekday evening or weekend. Distance learning programmes allow student to decide to attend tutorials. However, some tutorials require students to attend specific classes or laboratory courses. Besides, the University arranges tutors to provide students with guidance and assistance by phone, email or online at specific time. Tutors also provide feedback on all assignments to help guide students' learning.

Although most distance learning programmes are in open entry, with no entry requirements and time limits on finishing a qualification, students are required to complete specific assignments and to pass end-term exams during their study periods so as to attain the course credit. Besides, every distance learning programme, including diploma and degree programmes, is set with studying rules. Students are required to follow the rule to accumulate assigned course credits so as to apply for qualifications.

Governance and Organisation 
Hong Kong Metropolitan University Ordinance states that the Chief Executive (Hong Kong Governor before the return of Hong Kong to China) or a person designated by him shall be the Chancellor of the University.

Academic and Research Units 
The academic units of the University consists of:
School of Arts and Social Sciences
Lee Shau Kee School of Business and Administration
School of Education and Languages
School of Nursing and Health Studies
School of Science and Technology
School of Open Learning
Li Ka Shing School of Professional and Continuing Education (LiPACE)
The University Office of Research Affairs is set up to serve as a centralised unit of the University overseeing research activities of the University, supporting research carried out by staff of the University and co-ordinating development projects with external funding. There are six main research institutes and they are:
Institute for Research in Innovative Technology & Sustainability
Institute for Research in Open and Innovative Education
Research Institute for Bilingual Learning and Teaching (RIBiLT)
Institute of International Business and Governance
Public and Social Policy Research Centre
Research Institute for Digital Culture and Humanities
OUHK Tin Ka Ping Centre of Chinese Culture

Gallery

Campus development 

The earliest campus of the Open University of Hong Kong was located at the Hennessy Centre at Causeway Bay. Then, it moved to the Trade and Industry Department Tower in Mong Kok. It soon moved to the Princess Road, Ho Man Tin for the preparation of the grand opening of Ho Man Tin Campus.

In April 1996, the campus located in 30 Good Shepherd Street opened and provided students with an ideal learning environment.

In July 2000, the multimedia laboratory subsidised by the Hong Kong Jockey Club opened.

In October 2000, the Island Learning Centre located in Shun Tak Centre, Sheung Wan opened. The Open University of Hong Kong Centre for Continuing and Community Education was officially renamed as the Li Ka Shing Institute of Professional and Continuing Education to acknowledge the donation of $40 million by the Li Ka Shing Foundation in supporting the establishment of the Island Learning Centre.

In April 2005, the OUHK rented the entire 1/F of the Ho Man Tin Plaza as its learning centre.

In May 2005, the Campus Phase II Development started. The Project was to build an academic building of 12 floors at the carpark of Ho Man Tin Main Campus located at Good Shepherd Street. The expense of the Development was about $170 million. It received various donations from the public, including the TS Kwok Foundation, the Tin Ka Ping Foundation, Wong Bing-lai, Serena Yang Hsueh-chi, Stanley Ho Hung-sun, the Chiang Chen Industrial Charity Foundation, Cheng Yu-tung, Solomon Lee Kui-nang and others. The Campus Phase II Development Project received the Government interest-free loan of $120 million. The OUHK officially named the new academic building after Dr Kwok Tak Seng Building to acknowledge the TS Kwok Foundation granting a donation of $40 million to support the Campus Phase II Development Project. In August 2008, the Campus Phase II Building Ground-breaking Ceremony was held. On 22 January 2008, the OUHK named the high block of the Ho Man Tin main campus building after Cheng Yu-tung, in recognition of his donation of HK$35 million towards the development of the University's phase II campus extension.

In May 2008, the Clinical Nursing Education Centre opened. It is the simulation centre incorporating the learning elements of general, mental and Chinese medicinal nursing.

In September 2008, the Campus Phase II opened.

In September 2010, the OUHK named the courtyard of the Ho Man Tin Main Campus after Siu Tsang Fung Kwan, in recognition of the donation of 10 million by Mr Gerald C S Siu and the support from his mother Siu Tsang Fung Kwan and his wife.

In December 2012, the OUHK received the grant of land on Chung Hau Street, Ho Man Tin from the Education Bureau and made use of it to develop the Campus Phase III and a new academic institute. The expected expense was about $720 million. In January 2011, the Campus Phase III received the Government interest-free loan of $317 million. In February 2012, the OUHK named the new campus and the auditorium after the Jockey Club, in recognition of its donation of $190 million in supporting the development of the Campus Phase III. On 28 February 2012, the ground-breaking ceremony of the Campus Phase III was held.

In August 2012, the OUHK sold the Island Learning Centre located at Shun Tak Centre, Sheung Wan and purchased a new learning centre in Kwai Hing. In September 2013, the Kwai Hing Learning Centre opened. The Li Ka Shing Institute of Professional and Continuing Education (LiPACE) moved to the Kwai Hing Learning Centre at the Block 2 of the Kowloon Commerce Centre.

In February 2014, the Jubilee College at Jockey Club Campus of the OUHK officially opened.

In August 2014, the OUHK received the approval from the Town Planning Board, rezoning the vacant land of 11 years on Sheung Shing Street for the government and public purposes to facilitate the development of a new academic building。The Planning Department considered that the development would not bring any negative impacts to neighbouring areas. In the meantime, the Education Bureau also gave support to the extension project of the OUHK. Therefore, the application was finally approved.

In February 2017, the OUHK is going to build a Nursing and Healthcare Complex opposite to the Ho Man Tin Main Campus on Sheung Shing Street. The establishment of the new Complex will enable the University to cater to the future manpower requirements for nursing and other healthcare services, and will allow swift response to the new and unforeseen community needs that may arise as our society ages.

Campus locations

Ho Man Tin Campus 
The Ho Man Tin Campus consists of the Main Campus on Good Shepherd Street and the Jockey Club Campus.

The Main Campus is located at 30 Good Shepherd Street, adjacent to SKH Tsoi Kung Po Secondary School, the Hong Kong Football Association Limited and the Auxiliary Medical Service Headquarters. It consists of Block A, B and C.

Block A: The HKMU Campus Phase I High Block (Cheng Yu Tung Building), facing Fat Kwong Street
Block B: The HKMU Campus Phase I Low Block, facing Good Shepherd Street
Block C: The HKMU Campus Phase II (Kwok Tak Seng Building), facing Fat Kwong Street

The Main Campus is equipped with a library, lecture halls, tutorial rooms, self-study rooms, lobbies, a canteen, a café, a bank, an information centre, a mail room, pantries, a multi-function hall, changing rooms, language laboratories, multimedia laboratories, technology laboratories, environmental laboratories, clinical nursing laboratories, a sound recording studio, music rooms, band rooms, counselling rooms and a car park. Auxiliary facilities for people with disabilities are also available.

The Jockey Club Campus located at 81 Chung Hau Street, Ho Man Tin, adjacent to Dragon View and Hung Hom Division of the Hong Kong Police Force. The Jubilee College is of 12 floors and it consists of Block D and E. It takes a few minutes to walk from the Main Campus to the Jockey Club Campus.

Block D: The HKMU Jubilee College (facing Princess Road and Chung Hau Street)
Block E: The HKMU Jubilee College (facing Princess Road and Chung Hau Street)

Apart from the auditorium, classrooms, the library and PC laboratories, the College is equipped with learning commons, multi-function halls, cultural and creative studio, laboratories, testing and certification laboratories, microbiological laboratories and the clinical nursing centre.

HKMU Jockey Club Institute of Health Care (IOH) – Sheung Shing Street, Ho Man Tin

Block F: Jockey Club Institute of Health Care (IOH) (opposite to the HKMU Main Campus)

The establishment of the new campus will enable the University to cater to the future manpower requirements for nursing and other healthcare services and will allow swift response to the new and unforeseen community needs that may arise as our society ages. Meanwhile, new programmes such as Bachelor of Social Sciences with Honours in Mental Health and Psychology and Bachelor of Science with Honours in Nutrition and Dietetics are under planning to meet the growing demands for a wide array of healthcare professionals. Some brand-new facilities, including the psychology laboratory and the Special Educational Needs (SEN) service/training centre, will be built in the new Complex. They will become future assessment or resource centres for the public who have needs for specialised healthcare services.

Kwai Hing Campus (KHC) 
In August 2012, the HKMU purchased floors 8 – 12 of the Block 2 of the Kowloon Commerce Centre with $770 million. Each floor is about 25,000 sq. ft. The gross area is about 124,300 sq. ft.

The Kwai Hing Campus (KHC) is located at 8-11/F, Tower 2, Kowloon Commerce Centre, 51–53 Kwai Cheong Road, Kwai Chung, New Territories. The Kwai Hing Campus opened in September 2013 and the Li Ka Shing School of Professional and Continuing Education (LiPACE) also moved from the Island Learning Centre to the Kwai Hing Campus (KHC). After from classrooms, lecture theatre, PC laboratories, study rooms, student commons and a learning resources centre, the Campus is also equipped with Jockey Club STEAM Education Laboratory, Japanese Language & Cultural Studies Centre and mock up rooms, including cabin, smart hotel room, wards, Kindergarten room and CIS room.

CITA Learning Centre (OCC) 
The HKMU-CITA Learning Centre (OCC) opened in 2010, locating at 0/F – 5/F, HKMU-CITA Learning Centre (CITA Building), 201–203 Lai King Hill Road, Kwai Chung, New Territories. The area of the Centre is around 3,530 square metres with 11 classrooms, 3 PC laboratories, a learning resource centre, studios, self-study rooms and student amenities.

HKMU Consultants (Shenzhen) Limited 
The company is located in Shenzhen, Guangdong, mainland China. It is responsible for managing programmes of the OUHK held in China and handling the admission applications of mainland students.

Non-academic Development

Student activities
The HKMU always encourages its students to form societies and organise student activities. The University provides student organisations with assistance and help by Student Affairs Committee and Student Affairs Office. By planning and participating in various activities, students can improve their knowledge and enhance their organisational skills. Currently, there are near 50 student societies and various alumni associations accredited by the University and granted for subsidy. The associations provide students with various kinds of activities, including sports competitions, academic discussions, seminars, outdoor activities and rehearsal exercises.

Since the re-establishment of the Students' Union in 2008, the current Committee on Student Affairs transforms into the joint discussion platform of both the University representatives and the principle members of the Students' Union, helping to manage the constitute politics and financial affairs of student societies.

Students' Union
Every student who is registered on a credit-bearing course of study offered by HKMU during a session shall be entitled to exercise the rights and enjoy privileges of membership during such session. The Students’ Union aims to act as a channel of communication between the students and HKMU and other bodies, to promote a school spirit amongst the students, to promote the welfare of the students, to promote and develop social and educational opportunities for the students and to represent the students.

Executive committee
The Executive Committee is the highest executive authority of the Union and shall be accountable to the general polling, general meetings and the Union Council. It is responsible for the day-to-day affairs and administrative work of the Students’ Union.

The Executive Committee will consist of 6 to 18 committee members from a cabinet to be elected by the votes of all members. The committee members of the Executive Committee will consist of one President, one Internal Vice-President, one External Vice-President, one Financial Controller, one general secretary and not less than one and not more than thirteen additional members as may be elected as part of a cabinet of candidates. There must be 1/5 cabinet members whose study mode will be different from those other cabinet members.

The quorum of a meeting of the Executive Committee will be 1/2 or above of the committee members.

The President of the Executive Committee also serves as the ex-officio member of the Council and the Court. The Executive Committee can commission its members or student representatives to attend the following university meetings to express their views. The meetings include the Senate, the Catering Committee, the University Equal Opportunities Commission, the Committee on Student Affairs and the General Meeting of the Four Schools.

The office of the HKMU Students' Union's is located at Room C0314, 3/F, 30 Good Shepherd Street, Ho Man Tin, Kowloon, Hong Kong

List of the presidents of the HKMUSU:
1st session (2008–2009): WONG Tze
2nd session (2009–2010): WONG Kwun Lun
3rd session (2010–2011): LEUNG Hin Ming
4th session (2011–2012): LEUNG Lok Hang
5th session (2012–2013): Dickson CHAU Tsun Yin
6th session (2013–2014): Delison CHAN Pui Hei
7th session (2014–2015): Ian YIP Yee Yin
8th session (2015–2016): MAN Chun Kit
9th session (2016–2017): Gilbert CHAN Tsz Wai
10th session (2017–2018): Max YEUNG Hau Yin
11th session (2018–2019): Vacant
12th session (2019–2020): Vacant
13th session (2020–2021): Elvin LAU Yu Kit

The Elected President of the HKMUSU
14th session (2021–2022): WONG Wing Sum

Editorial Board
The Editorial Board is responsible for publishing the publications of the Students’ Union and shall be accountable to a general polling, general meetings and the Union Council. The duties of the Editorial Board include reflecting the views of students, reporting the policies of the University, reporting the activities in the University, being concerned with social topics and playing the role of monitoring as media.

The Editorial Board will consist of 7 to 15 committee members from a cabinet to be elected by all members and responsible for organising the Editorial Board. The committee members of the Editorial Board will consist of one Editor-in-chief, two Assistant Editors-in-chief, one Financial Controller, one general secretary, one Executive Editor and not more than nine additional members as may be elected as part of a cabinet of candidates.

The quorum of a meeting of the Editorial Board will be 1/2 or above of the committee members.

The Editorial Board used to be the standing subcommittee of the Executive committee of the Students' Union. The title of its publication is Open Voice. It is introduced by Wong Kwun-lun, the President of the 2nd Students' Union with the mission of "being open" and "injustice provoking outcry", addressing the University and student affairs. Leung Hin-ming took up his role as the 2nd Editor-in-chief of the Editorial Board, introducing more life elements in the publication and developing "Freshman Special Edition". The amount and quality of the later publications varied. The operational transparency and exposure were relatively low. In Year 2015 to 2016, the Editorial Board granted the statutory authority of independence. However, the designate cabinet came to dismissal at that time. The by-elected cabinet failed to succeed due to the inadequate polling rate. The first officially independent Editorial Board was elected in Year 2016 to 2017. Yau Wing-sze, the former Member of the 8th Editorial Board, took up the post of Editor-in-chief. The publication frequency changed from once a year to three times a year. The newly formed Editorial Board followed the existing idea and continued to publish "Freshman Special Edition". It also joined the Joint-University Editorial Board and established the office of the Editorial Board of HKMUSU. The office is located at E0716, Jubilee College, Chung Hau Street, Ho Man Tin, Kowloon.

Open Voice is the only student-driven, university-recognised-and-granted and editorial-independent publication of the HKMU.

List of Editor-in-chiefs:
1st session (2008–2009): WONG Kwun Lun
2nd session (2009–2010): LEUNG Hin Ming
3rd session (2010–2011): YU Yui Ching
4th session (2011–2012): LEE Wai Nan
5th session (2012–2013): LAU Tsz Kwan
6th session (2013–2014): LAM Lap Kwan
7th session (2014–2015): MANG Mong Wan

List of Editor-in-chiefs:(After independent)
1st session (2015–2016): Vacant
2nd session (2016–2017): YAU Wing Sze
3rd session (2017–2018): WONG Kai Yu
4th session (2018–2019): Vacant
5th session (2019–2020): Vacant

The Current Editor-in-chief:
6th session (2020–2021): WONG Ngo Tung

The Elected Editor-in-chief:
7th session (2021–2022): Vacant

The Union Council 
The Union Council is the legislative, supervising and judicial authority of the Union with its power only second to a general polling and a general meeting. Its duties include:
Examine, investigate and pass the year plans, budget plans, financial and working report of the Students’ Union;
Supervise the working condition of the Executive Committee and Editorial Board;
Interpret and amend the Constitution;
Hold the elections of Students’ Union;
Hold the elections of the Representatives of the Union Council;
Hold general polling and general meeting; 
Handle the resignations of the Councillors of the Union Council, Popularly Elected Councillors, committee members of the Executive Committee and committee members of the Editorial Board;
Enforce punishment; and
Set up Subcommittees under the Union Council

The Union Council will consist of one representative from each affiliated body, seven Popularly Elected Councillors (If there are less than seven Popularly Elected Councillors, their seats shall be deemed to be vacancies), three Ex-officio Councillors (the Chairperson of the Union Council of the previous session, the President of the Executive Committee and the Editor-in-chief of the Editorial Board)

 If the Chairperson of the Union Council of the previous session becomes a committee member of the Executive Committee of the current session or a committee member of the current session of the Editorial Board, his/her office should be filled by the Chairperson of the session before the previous session.
 If the President of the Executive Committee of the previous session becomes a committee member of the Executive Committee of the current session or a committee member of the current session of the Editorial Board, his/her office should be filled by the President of the session before the previous session.
 If the Editor-in-chief of the Editorial Board of the previous session becomes a committee member of the Executive Committee of the current session or the committee member of the current session of the Editorial Board, his/her office should be filled by the Editor-in-chief of the session before the previous session.

The Representatives of the Union Council will consist of one Chairperson, one Vice Chairperson, one Secretary, one Vice Secretary. The representatives of the Union Council will be elected by and among the Councillors. The Union Council will have the following standing subcommittees to assist in the carrying out of its work:
The Constitution Review Committee: consisting of 1 Chairperson and at least 3 other committee members to handle the matters on amending the Constitution.
The Election Board: consisting of 1 Chairperson and at least 3 other committee members to co-ordinate all the election matters of the Students’ Union.

The Union Council may set up different subcommittees according to circumstances. The chairperson of all the subcommittees must be Councillors and other committee members shall be members of the Union. The setting up of all committees shall have to be passed by the Union Council.

General meetings shall be called once a month. Notice of a meeting shall be given to Councillors and announce to members of the Union 1 week before calling the meeting together with the agenda thereof. Upon the joint requisition signed by 1/3 or above of the Councillors, or if the Chairperson thinks
that it is necessary, an emergency meeting may be called. Notice of a meeting shall be given to Councilors and announce to members of the Union 48 hours
before calling the meeting together with the agenda thereof.

The quorum of a meeting of the Union Council will be 1/2 or above of the Councillors.

The Chairperson of the Union Council also serves as the ex-officio member of the Court. The Union Council should also appoint a Councillor (popularly elected is preferred) as the representative to attend the Committee on Student Affairs.

List of Chairpersons of the Union Council:
1st session (2008–2009): CHAN Hing Wai
2nd session (2009–2010): LAW Tsz Chun (left the post in January 2010)/ LEUNG Tsz Yan (assumed office in February 2010)
3rd session (2010–2011): YAU Chun Yip
4th session (2011–2012): TSANG Hin Man
5th session (2012–2013): LAU Chun Kit
6th session (2013–2014): Ian YIP Yee Yin (left the post in January 2014)/ WONG Ho Yi (assumed office in February 2014)
7th session (2014–2015): HO Ki Hang
8th session (2015–2016): CHENG Chung Kit
9th session (2016–2017): TANG Sin Hang
10th session (2017–2018): Martin, HO Tsuen Ye
11th session (2018–2019): Faye WONG Kai Laam
12th session (2019–2020): Faye WONG Kai Laam (left the post in Angust 2019)/ Michael Kwok Tsz Tat (assumed office in September 2019)

The Current Chairperson of the Union Council:
13th session (2020–2021): Paul YEUNG Chun Hei

General Meetings 
A general meeting is an authority second to a general polling only. The Union Council should hold an annual general meeting in the first month (starting from April)of each session and the general meeting must be called within 7 to 21 days from a resolution made by the Union Council. At the general meeting, the Union of the previous session shall present its working report and financial report; the Union Council of the current session shall present its budget plan and the Executive Committee and the Editorial Board shall present their year plans and budget plans. Not less than 7 days notice of a general meeting shall be given, and notice shall be given by posting the same on the Union notice board in the campus of OUHK and sending the same by electronic means to members. The quorum of a general meeting will be not less than 100 members personally present. Where the quorum is not reached half an hour before the time appointed for conducting the meeting, the Chairperson shall declare the meeting flopped and may call another meeting again within 14 days. If the adjourned meeting still flops, the motion shall be withdrawn.

Upon a resolution of the Union Council being carried or upon the written requisition of not less than 100 Members, the Union Council shall, as regards the purpose indicated in the relevant resolution or the relevant requisition, call an emergency general meeting, which meeting must be conducted within 7 to 21 days from the day of the resolution or the requisition.

General Polling
A general polling is a means of the members of the Union to resolve issues by way of polling. A general polling is the highest authority of the Union. Upon the resolution of the Union Council being carried or upon the written requisition of not less than 500 members, the Union Council shall conduct a general polling as regards the purpose indicated in the relevant resolution or the relevant requisition, which general polling must be conducted within 7 to 21 days from the day of the resolution or the requisition. The valid votes cast is no less than 1/15 of the total members of the Union. The result of General Polling shall not be valid and the motion shall be deemed to have withdrawn if the number of votes cast is less than 1/15 of the total membership of the Union. A motion of a general polling shall only be carried by 1/2 or above affirmative vote of all the total votes for the motion.

Affiliated Societies 
An Affiliated Body means an organisation of members undertaking extra-curricular activities within the context of OUHK, the constitution of which provides that its membership is open to OUHK students and for its office bearers to be annually elected by its members. As of March 2021, there are 34 student societies for both distance learning and full-time programme students to join.

Programme-related societies (School of Arts and Social Sciences):
Animation and Visual Effects Society
Chinese Society
Cinematic Design and Photographic Digital Art Society
Creative Advertising and Media Design Society
Creative Writing and Film Arts Society
Psychology Society

Programme-related societies (Lee Shau Kee School of Business and Administration):
Student Association of Business and Administration
Accounting Society
Business Management Society
Hospitality and Tourism Management Society
Sports and Recreation Management Society

Programme-related societies (School of Education and Languages):
Applied Chinese Languages Studies Society
English Studies Society

Programme-related societies (School of Nursing and Health Studies):
Nursing Society

Programme-related societies (School of Science and Technology):
Applied Science and Environmental Studies Society
Computing Society
Engineering Society
Statistics Analysis and Data Science Society
Testing and Certification Society

Cultural Association:
Dancing Society
Drama Society
Japanese Culture Society
Music Society

Independent Club Association:
Chinese Students and Scholars Association
Christian Fellowship
Enactus
Film Society
Rotaract Club
Social Service Society

Sports Association:
Badminton Society
Dragon Boat Society
Rugby Society
Tchoukball Society

Educational TV Programmes 

With a mission to provide open and distance education, the OUHK has been purchasing airtime to broadcast television programmes for the benefit of the learning public since 1989. The programmes feature a wide spectrum of topics including arts, science, social sciences, business administration, education, information technology, child development and psychology as well as Chinese history and culture. They are either produced by the OUHK or purchased from the Open University of the UK or the China Central Radio and TV University.

In October 2015, the OUHK and Television Broadcasts Limited (TVB) once again made a joint effort to launch Open for Learning, the educational TV programme airing on TVB Pearl from 9 am to 1 pm every Sunday morning. The programme has been continuously brought to the public, enlightening not only students, but everyone in Hong Kong.

Lists of graduates

List of number of graduates

List of Honorary Graduates 
List of Honorary Graduates goes as follow:

(As of 11 November 2020)

List of Honorary University Fellows 
List of Honorary University Fellows goes as follow:

References

External links 

 
Hong Kong Metropolitan University Electronic Library
Free Courseware, Hong Kong Metropolitan University
Hong Kong Ordinance Chapter 1145 HONG KONG METROPOLITAN UNIVERSITY ORDINANCE

 
Nursing schools in Hong Kong
Ho Man Tin
Educational institutions established in 1989
1989 establishments in Hong Kong